Tayyaba Hasan is a Professor  of Dermatology  at the Wellman Center for Photomedicine at Harvard Medical School. She is one of the inventors of Visudyne, a Food and Drug Administration approved treatment for age-related macular degeneration. She received the 2018 SPIE Britton Chance Biomedical Optics Award.

Early life and education 
Hasan completed her bachelor's degree in chemistry at the University of Karachi in 1966. She earned her master's degree in 1968, specialising in organic chemistry. In 1970 Hasan gained a second master's degree from the University of Islamabad. She won the National Merit Scholarship from the Punjab Education Foundation. She moved to the University of Arkansas for her postgraduate research, earning a PhD in organic chemistry in 1980. She was elected to Sigma Xi.

Research 
After completing her PhD, Hasan joined the University of Pennsylvania as a postdoctoral research associate. She joined Harvard Medical School in 1982. Hasan worked with Alan Oseroff on antibody conjugate photosensitization of cells for receptor-based photolysis. She showed it was possible to target sub-cellular structures by photosensitisation. Hasan uses photodynamic therapy to diagnose and treat disease. She has trained dermatologists, ophthalmologists, urologists, gynaecologists and orthopaedic surgeons.

She demonstrated that benzoporphryin derivatives could be used to eliminate of subretinal vessels. She went on to discover visudyne with Ursula Schmidt. Visudyne is one of over twenty patents held by Hasan.  She was appointed to professor of dermatology in 2009. Her recent work considers ways to target glioma treatment and ovarian cancer. In 2011 she was the founding director of the Office for Research Career Development at Massachusetts General Hospital. She is targeting diseases such as leishmaniasis, mycobacterium tuberculosis and methicillin-resistant Staphylococcus aureus. Hasan's lab focusses on the photophysical and biological mechanisms of photodynamic therapy. She leads a National Cancer Institute funded project focussed on image-guided therapy for pancreatic and skin cancers. These include singlet oxygen formation, cytokine secretion.

The Hasan Lab run several separate research projects:

 Small Molecule Enhancers of Photodynamic Therapy for Skin Cancer
 Endoscopic Photodynamic and Combination Therapy for Local and Metastatic Pancreatic Tumors
 Mechanism-Based Design of Combination Therapies for Pancreatic Cancer
 Model-Based Dosimetry and Imaging for PDT

Hasan has served on the executive boards of several learned societies, including acting as President of the International Photodynamic Association, Vice President of Science for the Pan American PDT Association and President of the American Society for Photobiology (2010 - 2012). She contributed to the 2014 book Photodynamic Therapy: From Theory to Application. She serves on the advisory board of Polythea.

Awards 
2019 Fellow of The Optical Society for "pioneering advances in the broader field of photobiology".
2018 American Society for Photobiology Lifetime Achievement Award which recognizes the illustrious career of a senior researcher whose work has significantly advanced the research areas of the American Society for Photobiology 
2018  SPIE Britton Chance Biomedical Optics Award
2018 Society of Asian American Scientists in Cancer Research Award for Contributions to Cancer Research
2017 International Photodynamic Association Award for Significant Advancement of Photodynamic Therapy
2015 International Photodynamic Association Lifetime Achievement Award in PDT research for research excellence in the field of photodynamic therapy 
2014 Harvard-MIT Division of Health Sciences & Technology (HST), Harvard Medical School Directors' Award for Service to HST community 
2012 Mentor Award National Postdoctoral Association
2010 Science Club for Girls Catalyst Award Honouree for Dedication to equity in Science, Engineering and Technology
2009 Harvard Medical School William Silen Lifetime Achievement in Mentoring Award
2009 National Institutes of Health Pioneers in Biomedical Optics for Bench-to-Bedside Translation

References 

Pakistani scientists
University of Karachi alumni
University of Pennsylvania faculty
Harvard Medical School faculty
University of Arkansas alumni
Pakistani emigrants to the United States
Women in optics